Panama competed at the 1964 Summer Olympics in Tokyo, Japan. This was the nation's fifth appearance at the Olympics since its debut in 1928.

Wrestling

References
Official Olympic Reports

Nations at the 1964 Summer Olympics
1964
1964 in Panamanian sport